This list of literary awards from around the world is an index to articles about notable literary awards.

International awards

All nationalities & multiple languages eligible (in chronological order)
 Nobel Prize in Literature – since 1901
 Golden Wreath of Struga Poetry Evenings – since 1966
 Neustadt International Prize for Literature – since 1970
 International Botev Prize – since 1972
 The Bookseller/Diagram Prize for Oddest Title of the Year – since 1978
 Common Wealth Award of Distinguished Service – since 1979
 America Award – since 1994
 Balint Balassi Memorial Sword Award – since 1997
 Franz Kafka Prize – since 2001
 Sense of Gender Awards – since 2001
 Ovid Prize – since 2002
 Dayton Literary Peace Prize – since 2006
 European Union Prize for Literature – since 2009
 Jan Michalski Prize for Literature – since 2009
 Paris Literary Prize – since 2010
 KONS International Literary Award – since 2011
 Grand Prix of Literary Associations (English, French, and Spanish) – since 2013
 Zbigniew Herbert International Literary Award – since 2013
  (European Literature Award) – since 2011

Awards by language

Arabic

 Etisalat Award for Arabic Children's Literature
 International Prize for Arabic Fiction
 Katara Prize for Arabic Novel
 King Faisal International Prize for Arabic language and literature
 Naguib Mahfouz Medal for Literature
 Sheikh Zayed Book Award

Bengali

 Rabindra Puraskar
 Bankim Puraskar
 Ananda Puraskar
 Sahitya Akademi Award to Bengali Writers
 Bangla Academy Award

Chinese

Mao Dun Literature Prize
 Lu Xun Literary Prize
 Lao She Literary Award
 Dream of the Red Chamber Award
 Shi Nai'an Literary Prize
 Newman Prize for Chinese Literature
 Bing Xin Children's Literature Award

English

 International Dublin Literary Award
 Goldsmiths Prize
 Next Generation Indie Book Awards
 Booker Prize
 The Warwick Prize for Writing
 International Rubery Book Award
 Montreal International Poetry Prize
 Windham–Campbell Literature Prizes
 Caine Prize
 Queen Mary Wasafiri New Writing Prize

German 

 Georg Büchner Prize – for the overall literary oeuvre
 Sigmund Freud Prize – for scientific prose
 German Book Prize – for the best German language novel of the year
 Leipzig Book Fair Prize – in three categories: fiction, non-fiction, and translation
 Ingeborg Bachmann Prize
 Aspekte-Literaturpreis (Aspekte Literature Prize) – for the best debut novel written in German
 Kleist Prize – (first awarded in 1912)

Gujarati 

 Kumar Suvarna Chandrak
 Narmad Suvarna Chandrak
 Premanand Suvarna Chandrak
 Ranjitram Suvarna Chandrak
 Sahitya Gaurav Puraskar
 Yuva Gaurav Puraskar (conferred to young authors)

Hebrew

 Bialik Prize
 Sapir Prize
 Tchernichovsky Prize (for translation)

Kannada
 Rashtrakavi
 Nrupatunga Award
 Kanaka Shree
 Pampa Award

Malayalam

 Edasseri Award
 Ezhuthachan Puraskaram
 Kerala Sahitya Academy Award
 Muttathu Varkey Award
 Odakkuzhal Award
 Padmarajan Award
 Vallathol Award
 Vayalar Award

Marathi
 Vinda Karandikar Jeevan Gaurav Puraskar

Meitei (Manipuri) 

 Sahitya Akademi Award for Meitei
 Sahitya Akademi Translation Prize for Meitei
 Yuva Puraskar for Meitei

Odia
 Odisha Sahitya Academy Award

Portuguese

 Camões Prize
 Prémio Leya
 Portugal Telecom Prize for Literature (from 2007 onwards)
 São Paulo Prize for Literature

Spanish

 Miguel de Cervantes Prize
 Rómulo Gallegos Prize
 Sor Juana Inés de la Cruz Prize – female authors
 Premio Planeta
 Premio de Novela Ciudad de Torrevieja
 Premio Iberoamericano Planeta-Casa de América de Narrativa – since 2007
 Joaquín Gallegos Lara National Fiction Prize

Tamil
 Vishnupuram Award

Awards by region

African

 Babishai Niwe Poetry Foundation
 Brunel University African Poetry Prize
 Caine Prize
 Etisalat Prize for Literature
 Golden Baobab Prize
 Grand prix littéraire d'Afrique noire
 Lotus Prize for Literature (discontinued)
 Noma Award for Publishing in Africa (discontinued)
 Tchicaya U Tam'si Prize for African Poetry
 Wole Soyinka Prize for Literature in Africa

Asian

 Man Asian Literary Prize
 DSC Prize for South Asian Literature
 SAARC Literary Award
 Kiriyama Prize – for books about the Pacific Rim and South Asia; 1996–2008

Caribbean literature
 Casa de las Américas Prize
 OCM Bocas Prize for Caribbean Literature

Commonwealth

 Booker Prize – winners and shortlisted authors
 Commonwealth Short Story Prize
 Commonwealth Writers' Prize (discontinued)
 Encore Award – since 1990
 John Llewellyn Rhys Prize

European Union
 European Union Prize for Literature
 European Book Prize

Nordic

 Nordic Council's Literature Prize

Awards by country

American literature

 Aga Khan Prize for Fiction
 Aiken Taylor Award for Modern American Poetry
 Ambassador Book Award
 American Academy of Arts and Letters Gold Medals in Belles Lettres, Criticism and Essays
 American Academy of Arts and Letters Gold Medal in Drama
 American Academy of Arts and Letters Gold Medal for Fiction, Novels, Short Stories
 American Academy of Arts and Letters Gold Medal in Poetry
 American Book Awards
 Anisfield-Wolf Book Award
 Arab American Book Award
 Arthur Rense Prize
 Asian American Literary Awards
 Asian/Pacific American Awards for Literature
 Bancroft Prize
 Banipal Prize for Arabic Literary Translation
 The Best American Poetry series
 Best Translated Book Award
 Bobbitt National Prize for Poetry
 Bollingen Prize
 Bram Stoker Award
 Center for Fiction First Novel Prize
 Christopher Hewitt Award
 Colorado Book Award
 The Dana Award
 Donna J. Stone National Literary Awards
 Dos Passos Prize
Drue Heinz Literature Prize
 Edgar Allan Poe Award
 Edward Lewis Wallant Award
 Fabri Literary Prize
 Flannery O'Connor Award for Short Fiction
 Frost Medal
 Goldsmith Book Prize
 Gotham Book Prize
 Gregory Kolovakos Award
 Harold Morton Landon Translation Award
 Helen and Kurt Wolff Translator's Prize
 Hemingway Foundation/PEN Award
 Hispanic Heritage Award for Literature
 Hopwood Award
 Hugo Award
 James Duval Phelan Award
 James Jones First Novel Award
 James Laughlin Award
 Janet Heidinger Kafka Prize
 Jackson Poetry Prize
 The John Esten Cooke Fiction Award
 Joseph Henry Jackson Award
 Kate Tufts Discovery Award
 Kingsley Tufts Poetry Award
 Lambda Literary Award
 Lannan Literary Awards
 Los Angeles Times Book Prize
 Mary Tanenbaum Award for Nonfiction
 Michael Braude Award for Light Verse
 Minnesota Book Award
 National Book Award
 National Book Critics Circle Award
 National Hispanic Cultural Center Literary Award
 National Jewish Book Award, Jewish Book Council
 National Outdoor Book Award
 National Poetry Series
 National Translation Award
 Native Writers' Circle of the Americas
 Nebula Award for Science Fiction
 Newbery Medal
 The New Criterion Poetry Prize
 O. Henry Awards (for short stories)
 Oregon Book Award
 Outstanding Latino/a Cultural Award in Literary Arts or Publications
 Peggy V. Helmerich Distinguished Author Award
 PEN Award for Poetry in Translation
 PEN/Book-of-the-Month Club Translation Prize
 PEN/Faulkner Award for Fiction
 PEN/Malamud Award (for short stories)
 PEN Oakland/Josephine Miles Literary Award (for diversity and multi-cultural work)
 PEN/Open Book Award (formerly PEN/Beyond Margins, for writers of color)
 PEN/Ralph Manheim Medal for Translation
 PEN Translation Fund Grants
 Poets' Prize
 Premio Aztlán Literary Prize – emerging Chicana/o writers
 Publishing Innovation Award – ebooks and related technology
 Pulitzer Prize for
 History
 Fiction
 Poetry
 Drama
 General Non-Fiction
 Pushcart Prize
 Quill Awards
 Raiziss/de Palchi Translation Awards
 Robert Olen Butler Prize
 Ruth Lilly Poetry Prize
 Scott Moncrieff Prize
 Sherwood Anderson Foundation Award
 Short Story Award
 Spur Award
 St. Francis College Literary Prize
 St. Louis Literary Award
 Stone Award for Lifetime Literary Achievement
 Stonewall Book Award
 The Story Prize
 Tomás Rivera Mexican American Children's Book Award
 Wallace Stevens Award
 Walt Whitman Award
 William Faulkner – William Wisdom Creative Writing Competition
 Whiting Awards
 Willis Barnstone Translation Prize

Australian literature

 Aurealis Award awarded annually for Australian science fiction, fantasy and horror fiction
 The Australian/Vogel Literary Award for unpublished manuscripts by writers under the age of 35
 Miles Franklin Award for the best Australian published novel or play portraying Australian life in any of its phases
 New South Wales Premier's Literary Awards
 Patrick White Award
 Queensland Premier's Literary Awards
 Tasmanian Premier's Literary Prizes
 Western Australian Premier's Book Awards
 Victorian Premier's Literary Award

Austrian literature

 Ingeborg Bachmann Prize
 Feldkircher Lyrikpreis
 Erich Fried Prize
 Franz Kafka Prize
 Austrian State Prize for European Literature
 Anton Wildgans Prize

Bangladesh literature

 Bangla Academy Award

Botswana literature

 Bessie Head Literature Awards

Brazilian literature

 Prêmio Jabuti
 Prêmio Machado de Assis
 São Paulo Prize for Literature

British literature

 Author's Club First Novel Award
 Betty Trask Award
 Booker Prize
 British Book Awards – the "Nibbies"
 Chancellor's Gold Medal
 Commonwealth Short Story Prize
 Commonwealth Writers' Prize
 Dundee International Book Prize
 Duff Cooper Prize
 Forward Prize
 Hawthornden Prize
 Hessell-Tiltman Prize
 International Rubery Book Award
 James Tait Black Memorial Prize – for biography
 James Tait Black Memorial Prize – for fiction
 John Llewellyn Rhys Prize
 Meyer-Whitworth Award
 Newdigate Prize
 Orange Prize for Fiction
 Orwell Prize
 Samuel Johnson Prize
 SI Leeds Literary Prize
 Somerset Maugham Award
 T. S. Eliot Prize
 Waverton Good Read Award
 Costa Book Awards
 Marsh Biography Award – awarded biennially for the best biography written by a British author first published in the UK during the two preceding years.
 Marsh Award for Children's Literature in Translation – recognises the best translation of a children’s book from a foreign language into English and published in the UK.

Bulgarian literature

 Vick Prize

Canadian literature

 Arthur Ellis Award
 Atlantic Book Awards & Festival
 Booker Prize
 Burt Award for First Nations, Métis and Inuit Literature
 Canadian Jewish Book Awards
 Carol Bolt Award
 Commonwealth Writers' Prize
 Danuta Gleed Literary Award
 Dayne Ogilvie Prize
 Doug Wright Award
 Edna Staebler Award
 Geoffrey Bilson Award
 Gerald Lampert Award
 Griffin Poetry Prize
 Governor General's Award
 Herman Voaden Playwriting Competition
 Hilary Weston Writers' Trust Prize for Nonfiction
 Innis-Gérin Medal
 John Glassco Translation Prize
 Journey Prize
 Kobzar Literary Award
 Lane Anderson Award
 Lorne Pierce Medal
 McNally Robinson Aboriginal Book of the Year Award
 McNally Robinson Book of the Year Award
 Matt Cohen Award: In Celebration of a Writing Life
 Milton Acorn People's Poetry Award
 Norma Fleck Award
 Pat Lowther Award
 Percy Janes First Novel Award
 Prix Anne-Hébert
 Prix Athanase-David
 Prix du Cercle du livre de France
 Prix Ringuet
 RBC Bronwen Wallace Award for Emerging Writers
 ReLit Awards
 Rogers Writers' Trust Fiction Prize
 Ryerson Fiction Award (discontinued)
 Scotiabank Giller Prize. In 2005, the Giller prize was renamed to the Scotiabank Giller Prize.
 Shaughnessy Cohen Award
 [[Quebec Writers' Federation Fiction, Non-Fiction, Poetry, First Book, YA/Children, Spoken Word
 Stephen Leacock Award
 Sunburst Award
 TD Canadian Children's Literature Award
 Thomas Head Raddall Award
 Trillium Award
 Vicky Metcalf Award for Children's Literature
 Winterset Award
 Wright Awards
 Writers' Trust Distinguished Contribution Award
 Writers' Trust Engel/Findley Award

Chilean literature

 Chilean National Prize for Literature

Chinese literature

 Lu Xun Literary Prize
 Mao Dun Literature Prize
 Newman Prize for Chinese Literature

Costa Rican literature
 Premio Editorial Costa Rica

Croatian language 

 Croatia rediviva: Ča, Kaj, Što - baštinski dani
 Nagrada Ksaver Šandor Gjalski
 Nagrada Matice Hrvatske

Czech literature 

 Magnesia Litera Prize

Dutch literature 
 Libris Literatuur Prijs

Ecuadorian literature 

 Joaquín Gallegos Lara National Fiction Prize
 Premio Eugenio Espejo

Estonian literature

 Friedebert Tuglas short story award
 Juhan Smuul literary award

Finnish literature

 Finlandia Prize for literature
 Helsingin Sanomat Literature Prize
 Runeberg Prize for literature
 Thanks for the Book Award for literature

French literature

 Grand Prix du roman de l'Académie française
 Grand Prix de Littérature Policière
 Prix Alain-Fournier
 Prix Décembre
 Prix des Deux-Magots
 Prix Femina
 Prix Fénéon
 Prix de Flore
 Prix du roman Fnac
 Prix Goncourt
 Prix Interallié
 Prix Littéraire Valery Larbaud
 Prix Médicis
 Prix Mystère de la critique
 Prix de la Page 112
 Prix du Quai des Orfèvres
 Prix Renaudot
 Candide Preis (the only German-French Literary award)

Georgian literature

 Shota Rustaveli State Prize

German literature

 Bertelsmann-Preisausschreiben
 Bertolt-Brecht-Literaturpreis
 Candide Preis – German-French literary award in memory of Voltaire's novella Candide – since 1995
 Carl Zuckmayer Medal, an annual literary prize awarded by the state of Rhineland Palatinate in memory of Carl Zuckmayer
 Deutscher Jugendliteraturpreis
 Fontane Prize of the City of Neuruppin
 German Book Prize – awarded annually during the Frankfurt Book Fair for the best German language novel of the year
 Georg Büchner Prize – awarded annually by the Deutsche Akademie für Sprache und Dichtung in memory of Georg Büchner
 Goethe Prize – awarded triennially by the city of Frankfurt in memory of Johann Wolfgang von Goethe; since 1927
 Hanseatic Goethe Prize
 Heinrich Heine Prize
 Hermann-Hesse-Preis
 Hans Fallada Prize – biennial literary prize in memory of Hans Fallada
 Heinrich Mann Prize
 Hermann Kesten Medal
 Ingeborg Bachmann Prize (Austrian)
 Kassel Literary Prize
 Kleist Prize
 Kurd-Laßwitz-Preis – annual science fiction award in memory of Kurd Laßwitz, inspired by the American Nebula Award
 Leipzig Book Fair Prize
 Nelly Sachs Prize
 Roswitha Prize
 Schiller Memorial Prize
 Toucan Prize

Hungarian literature

 Balint Balassi Memorial Sword Award – for poets and translators; since 1997
 Baumgarten Prize
 Kossuth Prize

Icelandic literature

 Icelandic Literary Prize

Indian literature

 Jnanpith Award
 Sahitya Akademi Award
 Pampa Award
 Saraswati Samman
 Yuva Puraskar (conferred to young authors)
 Vinda Karandikar Jeevan Gaurav Puraskar
 Jibanananda Das Award
 Tagore Award
 Assam Valley Literary Award
 All India Poetry Prize

Indonesian literature

 Jakarta Arts Council Novel Competition

Iranian literature

 Jalal Al-e Ahmad Literary Awards
 Persian Speculative Art and Literature Award

Irish literature

 Irish Book Awards
 The Francis MacManus Award

Israeli literature

 Bialik Prize
 Geffen Award
 Jerusalem Prize – since 1963
 Sapir Prize
 Yitzhak Sadeh Prize

Italian literature

 Bagutta Prize
 Premio Bancarella
 Premio Campiello
 Premio Strega
 Premio Urania
 Viareggio Prize
 Flaiano Prize

Japanese literature

 Akutagawa Prize
 Bungei Prize
 Dazai Osamu Prize
 Edogawa Rampo Prize
 Honkaku Mystery Award
 Izumi Kyōka Prize for Literature (Izumi Kyōka Bungaku Shō)
 Kikuchi Kan Prize (Kan Kikuchi Shō)
 Mishima Yukio Prize
 Mystery Writers of Japan Award
 Naoki Prize (Naoki Sanjūgo Shō)
 Noma Prize for Literature
 Ōe Kenzaburō Prize
 Tanizaki Prize
 Yamamoto Shūgorō Prize
 Yomiuri Prize for Literature

Luxembourgian literature

 Batty Weber Prize
 Servais Prize

Malaysian literature

Malaysia Premier's Literary Award
Malaysian National Laureate

Mexican literature

 Premio Nacional de Lingüística y Literatura
 Xavier Villaurrutia Award
 FIL Literary Award in Romance Languages

Nepalese Literature
 Madan Puraskar

New Zealand literature

 Esther Glen Award – for children's literature
 Joy Cowley Award – for children's literature
 Sir Julius Vogel Award – for science fiction and fantasy
 New Zealand Post Book Awards
 Ngaio Marsh Award
 Margaret Mahy Award
 Prime Minister's Awards for Literary Achievement

Nigerian literature

 Nigeria Prize for Literature
 Wole Soyinka Prize for Literature in Africa
 9mobile Prize for Literature
 Engineer Mohammed Bashir Karaye Prize for Hausa Writing – for works in the Hausa language

Norwegian literature

 Halldis Moren Vesaas Prize
 NBU-prisen
 Norwegian Academy Prize in memory of Thorleif Dahl
 Norwegian Academy of Literature and Freedom of Expression
 Norwegian Critics Prize for Literature

Philippine literature

 Palanca Award
 Philippine National Book Awards

Polish literature

 Angelus Award
 Found in Translation Award
 Gdynia Literary Prize
 Janusz A. Zajdel Award for science fiction
 Kościelski Award
 Nautilus Award
 Nike Award
 Paszport Polityki for Literature
 Ryszard Kapuściński Award for Literary Reportage
 Silesius Poetry Award
 Śląkfa Award
 Wisława Szymborska Award

Portuguese literature

 Prémio Camões

Russian literature

 Solzhenitsyn Prize
 Russian Booker Prize
 Pushkin Prize
 Yasnaya Polyana Literary Award

Serbian literature

 Isidora Sekulić Award
 NIN Award

Singaporean literature

 Epigram Books Fiction Prize
 Singapore Literature Prize

Slovene literature

 Fabula Award
 Jenko Award
 KONS International Literary Award
 Kresnik Award
 Levstik Award
 Prešeren Award
 Prešeren Foundation Award
 Rožanc Award
 Veronika Award
 Vilenica Prize

South African literature

 Alan Paton Award
 Alba Bouwer Prize
 Amstel Playwright of the Year Award
 ATKV Prose Prize
 Barry Ronge Fiction Prize
 C.P. Hoogenhout Award
 Central News Agency Literary Award
 David Higham Prize for Fiction
 Dinaane Debut Fiction Award
 Exclusive Books Boeke Prize
 Eugène Marais Prize
 Hertzog Prize
 Ingrid Jonker Prize
 M-Net Literary Awards
 Maskew Miller Longman Literature Awards
 Media24 Books Literary Awards
 Olive Schreiner Prize
 Percy FitzPatrick Award
 Sol Plaatje Prize for Translation
 South African Literary Awards
 Sunday Times CNA Literary Awards
 The Cape Tercentenary Foundation
 Thomas Pringle Award
 University of Johannesburg Prize
 W.A Hofmeyr Prize

South Korean literature 

 Dong-in Literary Award
 Hyundae Munhak Award
 Manhae Prize
 Yi Sang Literary Award
 So-Wol Poetry Prize
 Park Kyung-ni Prize
 Ho-Am Prize in the Arts

Spanish literature

 Miguel de Cervantes Prize
 Premio Nadal
 Premio Planeta
 Premio de Novela Ciudad de Torrevieja
 Rómulo Gallegos Prize
 Premio Nacional de Literatura
 Premio Azorín
 Premio de la Crítica
 Premi Prudenci Bertrana
 Prince of Asturias Awards – since 1981

Sri Lanka

 Gratiaen Prize
 State Literary Award

Swedish literature

 Augustpriset
 De Nios Stora Pris
 Best Swedish Crime Novel Award – awarded by Swedish Crime Writers' Academy

Swiss literature

 Max Frisch Prize
 Solothurner Literaturpreis
 Swiss Book Prize

Thai literature

 S.E.A.Write Award
 Sriburapha Award

Turkish literature

 Erdal Oz Literature Award
 Sedat Simavi Literature Award

Ukrainian literature

 Shevchenko National Prize since 1961

Venezuelan literature

 Adriano González León Biennial Novel Prize

Zimbabwean literature
 National Arts Merit Awards

Awards by genres

Children's literature

See also the Database of Children's Literature Awards
 Newbery Medal and Newbery Honor (USA) – since 1922
 Carnegie Medal (UK) – since 1936
 Caldecott Medal and Caldecott Honor (USA) for illustration – since 1938
 Children's Book Council of Australia Awards (Australia) – since 1946
 Governor General's Award for English language children's literature (Canada) – since 1949
 Jane Addams Children's Book Award (USA) – since 1953
 Children's Literature Legacy Award (USA) – since 1954, formerly the Laura Ingalls Wilder Medal
 Hans Christian Andersen Award (international) – since 1956
 Kate Greenaway Medal for illustration (UK) – since 1956
 Dorothy Canfield Fisher Children's Book Award (USA) – since 1957
 Nienke van Hichtum-prijs (Netherlands) – since 1964
 Guardian Award (UK) – since 1967
 Sydney Taylor Book Award for Jewish children's and teen literature – since 1968
 Coretta Scott King Award for African-American Literature (USA) – since 1970
 Tir na n-Og Awards (Wales, UK) – since 1976
 Nestlé Smarties Book Prize (UK) – 1985–2007
 Prix Sorcières (France) – since 1986
 Governor General's Award for French language children's literature (Canada) – since 1987
 CBI Book of the Year Awards (Ireland) – since 1990
 Gelett burgess children's book award (USA) – since 2010
 Anne V. Zarrow Award for Young Readers' Literature (USA) – since 1991
 The Eilis Dillon Award (Ireland) – since 1995
 Angus Book Award (UK) – since 1996
 Pura Belpré Award for Latino literature (USA) – since 1996
 Marsh Award for Children’s Literature in Translation (UK) – since 1996
 Children's Laureate (UK) – since 1999
 Michael L. Printz Award for young adult literature (USA) – since 2000
 Sibert Medal for informational books (USA) – since 2001
 Mildred L. Batchelder Award (USA)
 Super Dash Novel Rookie of the Year Award (Japan) – since 2001
 Astrid Lindgren Memorial Award (international) – since 2003
 NSK Neustadt Prize for Children's Literature – since 2003

Food and drink

 Langhe Ceretto Prize (international) – since 1991

History

 Cundill Prize for historical non-fiction – since 2008
 Duff Cooper Prize — since 1956
 Wolfson History Prize – since 1972

Horror fiction

 Bram Stoker Award – for superior achievement in horror writing, since 1987
Shirley Jackson Award – for outstanding achievement in the literature of psychological suspense, horror and the dark fantastic, since 2007.
 Lord Ruthven Award – for the best fiction on vampires and the best academic work on the study of the vampire figure in culture and literature – since 1989

Military fiction and military history

 Colby Award for a first work of fiction or non-fiction – since 1999
 Pritzker Military Literature Award for Lifetime Achievement in Military Writing – since 2007
 W.Y. Boyd Literary Award for Excellence in Military Fiction – since 1997

Mystery: crime fiction and detective fiction

 Agatha Award
 Agatha Christie Award (Japan)
 Anthony Award
 Arthur Ellis Awards by the Crime Writers of Canada
 Ayukawa Tetsuya Award
 Barry Award
 Best Swedish Crime Novel Award – awarded by Swedish Crime Writers' Academy
 Crime Writers' Association awards:
 Cartier Diamond Dagger
 Dagger in the Library
 Dagger of Daggers
 Duncan Lawrie International Dagger
 Gold Dagger
 Ian Fleming Steel Dagger
 Short Story Award
 Davitt Award
Glass Key award
 Grand Prix de Littérature Policière
 Hammett Prize
 Honkaku Mystery Award – awarded by Honkaku Mystery Writers Club of Japan
 Japan Adventure Fiction Association Prize
 Left Coast Crime awards
 Lefty award
 The Bruce Alexander Memorial Historical Mystery
 Macavity Award
 Martin Beck Award
 Mephisto Prize
 Mystery Writers of America awards:
 Edgar Award
 Mystery Writers of Japan awards:
 Mystery Writers of Japan Award
 Edogawa Rampo Prize
 Ned Kelly Awards
Shamus Award
 Staunch Book Prize
 Theakston's Old Peculier Crime Novel of the Year Award

Romance Fiction 
 RITA Award

Speculative fiction (science fiction and fantasy)

 Hugo Award – since 1955
 Nebula Award – since 1965
 Ditmar Award (Australia) – since 1969
 BSFA award – since 1970
 Seiun Award – since 1970
 Locus Award – since 1971
 Mythopoeic Awards – awards for the best of mythic fantasy, following in the tradition of J. R. R. Tolkien and C.S. Lewis – since 1971
 Prix Tour-Apollo Award – since 1972
 John W. Campbell Memorial Award for Best Science Fiction Novel – since 1973
 John W. Campbell Award for Best New Writer in Science Fiction – since 1973
 World Fantasy Award – since 1975
 Paul Harland Prize (Netherlands) – since 1976
 Prometheus Award – best Libertarian SF – since 1979
 Nihon SF Taisho Award – since 1980
 Prix Aurora Award (Canada) – since 1980
 Prix Rosny-Aîné (France) – since 1980
 Kurd-Laßwitz-Preis (Germany) – since 1981
 Philip K. Dick Award – since 1982
 Compton Crook Award – best first time novel in genre in a year, since 1983
 Janusz A. Zajdel Award (Poland) – since 1984
 Writers of the Future – contest for new authors, since 1985
 Tähtivaeltaja Award (Finland) – since 1986
 Arthur C. Clarke Award – since 1987
 Japan Fantasy Novel Award – since 1989
 Sir Julius Vogel Award (New Zealand) – since 1989
 Urania Award (Italy) – since 1989
 SFRA Pioneer Award – best critical essay-length work, since 1990
 Tiptree award – since 1991
 Chandler Award (Australia) – since 1992
 Sidewise Award for Alternate History – since 1995
 Aurealis Award (Australia) – since 1995
 Thomas D. Clareson Award for Distinguished Service – promotion of SF teaching and study, etc., since 1996
 Endeavour Award (Pacific Northwest) – since 1999
 Nautilus Award (Poland) – since 2003
 WSFA Small Press Award – since 2007
 Tähtifantasia Award (Finland) – since 2007
 Kitschies (UK) – since 2009
 Le PLIB (France) – promotion of Science Fiction and Fantasy by Literary Influencers, since 2018

Sports

General
 William Hill Sports Book of the Year (UK)
 British Sports Book Awards (UK)
 PEN/ESPN Award for Literary Sports Writing (US)

Baseball
 CASEY Award (US)
 Jerry Malloy Book Prize (US)
 Seymour Medal (US)
 Dave Moore Award (US)

Biography

 Marsh Biography Award – awarded biennially for the best biography written by a British author and first published in the UK during the two preceding years.

Miscellaneous
 Goodreads Choice Awards
 Scribe Award – awarded by the International Association of Media Tie-In Writers for works of tie-in fiction. Numerous IPs have been nominated have been nominated for the Scribe Award, including movie novelizations and adaptations for Star Wars, Star Trek, Godzilla, Warhammer, Marvel, BattleTech, Murder She Wrote, X-Files, and more.

Awards for literary translation

 Gregory Kolovakos Award – PEN America : U.S. literary translator, editor, or critic whose work ... extends Gregory Kolovakos's commitment to the richness of Hispanic literature and to expanding its English-language audience
 PEN Translation Prize – awarded annually for a translation from any language into English.
 Oxford-Weidenfeld Translation Prize – awarded annually for a book-length translation from any language into English.
 Rossica Translation Prize – awarded biennially by Academia Rossica to a translation from Russian into English.
 National Book Award for Translated Literature – awarded annually for a fiction or non-fiction translation from any language into English by the National Book Award
 National Translation Award – an annual prize awarded by the American Literary Translators Association
 Popescu Prize – awarded biennially for a translation of poetry from a European language into English. Awarded by the Poetry Society.
 Willis Barnstone Translation Prize – annually awarded to a translation of a poem from any language into English.
 Scott Moncrieff Prize – awarded annually for French to English translation.
 Banipal Prize for Arabic Literary Translation – awarded annually for Arabic to English literary translation.
 Sol Plaatje Prize for Translation – awarded for a translation of prose or poetry into English from any other of the South African official languages.
 Rossica Young Translators Prize – open to submissions from translators aged under 25, awarded annually for the translation of a passage of contemporary fiction from Russian into English.
 Harvill Secker Young Translators Prize – open to submissions from translators aged between 18 and 34, awarded annually, focusing on a different language every year.
 International Dublin Literary Award – since 1996
 Helen and Kurt Wolff Translator's Prize – since 1996

Awards for literary criticism
 Nona Balakian Citation for Excellence in Reviewing – awarded annually for literary criticism as one of the National Book Critics Circle Awards.
 Truman Capote Award for Literary Criticism – awarded annually for literary criticism by the University of Iowa on behalf of the Truman Capote Literary Trust.
 Kerala Sahitya Akademi Award for Literary Criticism – awarded to Malayalam language literary criticism, as a category of the Kerala Sahitya Akademi Award

See also
 List of poetry awards
 List of comics awards
 List of Australian literary awards
 List of literary awards honoring women
 List of the world's richest literary prizes

References

External links
 Graphical Author and Novel Ranking by Literary Awards: graphical ranking of authors and novels that received prominent literary award honors (tabs across the top)
 African Literary Awards Database, Indiana University

 Literary

Awards
Poetry awards
Children's literary awards